Gleydson de Oliveira Santos or simply Gleydson (born August 13, 1989 in Natal), is a Brazilian central defender. He currently plays for Corinthians.

Contract
15 May 2007 to 14 May 2010

External links
 CBF

1989 births
Living people
Brazilian footballers
Sport Club Corinthians Paulista players
Grêmio Foot-Ball Porto Alegrense players
Association football defenders
People from Natal, Rio Grande do Norte
Sportspeople from Rio Grande do Norte